Marcus Fulvius Curvus Paetinus was a Roman suffect consul in 305 BC with Lucius Postumius Megellus. He was elected to replace Tiberius Minucius Augurinus, who died in office.

He was the son of Lucius Fulvius Curvus, consul in 322 BC. He was a member of the plebeian Fulvia gens.

He defeated the Samnites in the Second Samnite War, and celebrated a triumph.

References

Curvus Paetinus, Marcus
Ancient Roman generals
4th-century BC Roman consuls